Albert Guyot (25 December 1881 in Orléans – 24 May 1947 in Neuilly-sur-Seine)  was a French racecar driver. He was one of four drivers who entered with Duesenberg the 1921 French Grand Prix, the first in which a US make participated. Jimmy Murphy won with his Duesenberg 183; Guyot finished 6th.

Indy 500 results

References

French racing drivers
1881 births
1947 deaths
Indianapolis 500 drivers
Sportspeople from Orléans